Captain Courageous may refer to:

 Captain Courageous (comics), a comic book character
 Paul Kelly (Australian rules footballer) (born 1969), Australian Rules footballer

See also
 Captains Courageous, an 1897 novel by Rudyard Kipling